The Tamil Nadu Newsprint and Papers Limited (TNPL) was established by the Government of Tamil Nadu to produce newsprint and writing paper using bagasse, a sugarcane residue. The Government of Tamil Nadu listed the paper mill in April 1979 as one of the most environmentally compliant paper mills in the world under the provisions of the Companies Act of 1956. The factory is situated at Kagithapuram  in the Karur District of Tamil Nadu and Manapparai, Trichy district of Tamilnadu. The registered office of the company is located in Guindy, Chennai.

History
The Company commenced production in the year 1984 with an initial capacity of 90,000 tonnes per annum. TNPL has started the commercial production of newsprint on its new Paper Machine No. 2 from January 1996. The machine was supplied jointly by Voith Sulzer Paper Technology and its licensee in India, Larsen and Toubro Limited and has opened up new vistas for newsprint making. The machine is designed to run with 100% bagasse. Over the years, the production capacity has been increased to 2,45,000 tonnes per annum and the Company has emerged as the Largest bagasse based Paper Mill in the world consuming about one million tonnes of bagasse every year. The Company is in the process of implementing the Mill Expansion Plan for increasing the capacity to 4,00,000 tonnes per annum from July 2010.

Technology / process
TNPL has ventured with nearby sugar mills such as Sakthi Sugar Mills for continued supply of Bagasse for the Paper mill where Steam will be provided to the sugar mill in exchange of bagasse.

|-
|style="text-align: left;"|Notes:

Quality standards
TNPL has obtained the ISO 9001 – 2000 certification from RWTUV of Germany for development, manufacture and supply of Newsprint and Printing & Writing Paper.

Environment Protection Measures
TNPL is accredited with ISO14001:2004 certification for an effective environmental management system. By using bagasse as primary raw material, TNPL preserves over ‘'40000 acres of forest land from depletion every year'’.

TNPL Effluent Water Lift Irrigation Society (TEWLIS)
Under the TNPL Effluent Water Lift Irrigation Scheme, the farmers will be provided treated effluent water for irrigation purpose. TNPL uses a state-of-the-art sludge treatment system for treatment of Effluent water. TNPL's effluents have to comply with the norms set by the Tamil Nadu Pollution Control Board.

TNPL Plantation Programme
As per the National Forest Policy, 1988, forest based Industries should raise the raw material needed for meeting their own requirements. In accordance with the law, TNPL has embarked upon development of a plantation in the year 2004–05 and launched two plantation schemes, namely Farm Forestry and Captive Plantation.

Farm Forestry
Under the farm forestry scheme, the Company motivates and facilitates the marginal and small farmer to take up pulpwood plantation.  The salient features of the Scheme are a supply of quality planting material at subsidized cost, arranging credit facilities for the needy people through banks, providing timely technical advice through a team of qualified professionals, and buy back arrangement with minimum support prices or prevailing market rate at the time of felling, whichever is higher, and harvesting and transport of pulpwood from the farmer's field to Factory at company's cost.

Captive Plantation
In the captive plantation scheme, Captive plantations are raised in the lands belonging to the Company, Government Departments, and Educational institutions and in the large land-holding individuals on a revenue sharing basis or on a lease rental basis. The minimum criteria for captive plantation is that the land should be a block of  & above in a single location whereas less than is also considered only in the case of adjoining lands of existing captive plantations, provided the adjoining areas should be contiguous to the existing plantation.
TNPL enters into a MoU with the owners of such lands for raising a Captive Plantation and undertaking the responsibility of land development, establishment of plantations, maintenance of plantation and harvesting the pulpwood at TNPL's expense. The land would be taken either on long term lease spanning over a period of 6 to 30 years lease or on a gross revenue sharing basis. In the revenue sharing pattern, if the plantation is raised in a barren land, the produce is shared between TNPL and the landowner on a 70:30 basis and in case of wet lands, the revenue sharing pattern is 60:40. In the case of lease mode, the lease rent for a barren land is 1000 per acre, whereas for an irrigated land it is 3000 per acre every year paid to landowner and the entire product is taken by TNPL.

In the last five years of operation (2004–05 to 2008–09), TNPL has raised plantation in  involving 8235 farmers in twenty eight districts in Tamil Nadu under the Farm Forestry scheme and  under the Captive Plantation Scheme. In all, TNPL has established pulpwood plantations in about 40291 acres (as on 31 March 2009).

Clonal Propagation and Research Centre (CPRC)
To cater to the need for a huge amount of planting material to the tune of 15 million plants to cover  every year, TNPL established a state-of-the-art clonal propagation and research centre (CPRC) to achieve self-sufficiency in planting material and production of quality clonal/ seedling plants with a capacity of 15 million plants per annum. The clonal production centre was started with a mini clonal hedge garden of 4000 sq.m, a mist chamber of 8000 sq.m, 5300 sq.m of hardening chamber and 20000 sq.m of open nursery with updated technological innovations as per international standards. The clonal production center was established at an outlay of about 50 million. This is considered to be a milestone in the plantation activities and assures quality planting material availability throughout the year
The above plantation schemes are being implemented throughout Tamil Nadu through 10 regional offices in Karur, Manaparai, Tirunelveli, Karaikudi, Pudukottai, Namakkal, Trichy, Tanjore, Jayangondam and Panruti providing advice and technical assistance to tree growers.

Forestry research and development
TNPL has partnered with the NAIP-ICAR sponsored project titled "A value chain on industrial Agro-forestry in Tamil Nadu" for Promotion of tree husbandry with improved short rotation clones/genotypes through contract farming. Forest College & Research Institute (FC & RI), Tamil Nadu Agricultural University, Mettupalayam is the Consortium Leader of this project.  This project is being implemented for raising  of cluster plantation in 10 Taluks covering 5 Districts in Tamil Nadu.

Solid waste management
 Fly ash generated at the power boilers is being sold to the cement plants
 Effluent sludge is being sold to the Board manufacturing units
 Lime sludge generated is being recycled in the Lime Kiln

TNPL has obtained the prestigious ISO 14001 Certification from RMTUV, Germany for "Successfully establishing and applying environmental management system for development, manufacture and supply of paper".
This certification duly acknowledges TNPL's commitment for environment protection and sustained efforts to minimise the overall environmental impact.
  TNPL has commissioned the Bio-methanation plant, which generates around 23000 m3 of biogas (methane) per day, to be used as fuel in the lime-kiln in replacement of furnace oil. The biogas e replaces around 10–12 KL of furnace oil per day in the lime-kiln. During the year 2003–04, the bio- methanation plant generated 4145,000 m3 of methane gas and replaced the use of furnace oil worth 24.8 million
  TNPL obtained the 3 Leaves Award under the Green Rating project of the Centre for Science and Environment, New Delhi during October 2004, in recognition of the Environment Management System.

Energy management policy
TNPL has installed its own power generating facility to make it 100% self-sufficient through the installation of 61.18 MW Power Generating equipments (TG Sets) installed at the paper mill site. The surplus power generated is being exported to the State Grid.
TNPL also generates green power through the 18 MW wind farm installed at Devarkulam and Perungudi of Tirunelveli district. The entire power generated at the wind farm is being exported to the State Grid. The wind farm capacity has been enhanced to 21.75 MW in March 2004 by installing 3 wind turbine generators of 1250 kW capacity each.
It has installed a Bio-methanation plant to generate methane gas from the effluent water (bagasse wash water) and use it as fuel as substitute for furnace oil in the lime kiln saving 10 KL of furnace oil every day. During the year 2004–05 TNPL generated 3412,000 m3 methane gas from its bio-methanation plant and used the same in lime-kiln replacing 1886 KL of furnace oil valuing 20 million. The confederation of Indian Industry has recognised the bio-methanation project implemented by TNPL as an Innovative Project. This project contributes to sustainable development in terms of generating in-house renewable energy and reducing green house gases.

Clean Development Mechanism (CDM) projects in TNPL
Registered CDM project
 Methane Extraction and fuel conservation Project
 6.75 MW Small Scale Grid Connected Wind Electricity Generation Project

Methane extraction and fuel conservation project
TNPL commissioned a special kind of reactor concept for the "high rate" anaerobic treatment of wastewater called the Upflow Anaerobic Sludge Blanket (UASB) reactor which uses anaerobic granular sludge bed technology. The most common Bagasse Wash Water (BWW) treatment system used in India consists of a pond or a lagoon treatment system, which undergoes anaerobic digestion that releases a significant amount of greenhouse gases (GHG) into the atmosphere. In addition, the project also involves a system for utilization of extracted biogas which gained CDM benefits for the project from the closed reactor as fuel in a lime kiln, which had been using furnace oil (fossil fuel). Installation of a closed reactor by TNPL for anaerobic digestion of BWW will have many environmental and sustainable development benefits.

 Replacement of the current wastewater treatment system by a closed anaerobic digester will mitigate large quantities of CH4, a potent GHG, from being emitted into the atmosphere.
 Controlled environment in which the BWW is treated will reduce strong odours being emitted from the putrescent and degradable components of BWW.
 By recovering the resulting biogas in the form of CH4 and using it as a renewable in-house fuel for heating equipment, the project activity will contribute to the development of renewable sources as per India's Sustainable Development objectives.
 The furnace oil which would be replaced by the biogas has a sulphur content of 3.49%. This would result in the emission of sulphur dioxide (SO2) gas which is responsible for acid rain.
 The use of domestically available biogas as an energy resource helps conserve foreign exchange, apart from creating local rural employment opportunities, by reducing the need to import fossil fuels to meet the country's growing energy requirements.
 Furnace oil saving will reduce the associated CO2 (GHG) emissions. By registering with UNFCCC for CDM benefit, TNPL became the first paper mill in the country that has registered a CDM project with the UNFCC in waste management.

6.75 MW Small Scale Grid Connected Wind Electricity Generation Project
 
TNPL has gained CDM benefits by generating green energy through renewable wind energy. The project activity involves the installation, operation and maintenance of seven grid connected wind electricity generators (WEG) owned by the project proponent, TNPL. The electricity generated from the seven WEGs will be exported to the Tamil Nadu state electricity board (TNEB) grid. The seven WEGs have been installed in two phases. The first phase involved installation of four NEG Micon 750 kW WEGs and the second phase involved the erection of three Suzlon Energy WEGs of 1.25 MW. All seven WEGs have been installed in the Thirunelveli district, in the state of Tamil Nadu, India.

On 30 March 2001, TNPL commenced operations for the first phase of the project with the installation of the four 750 kW WEGs. The second phase of the project has commenced operations in March 2004. All 7 machines supply and sell power to the TNEB grid.

By displacing the electricity from fossil fuel based electricity generating systems, average
estimated GHG reduction from the project activity is expected to be 14431 tons CO2 per year.

Savings from CDM projects

TNPL’s products
The paper produced by TNPL is manufactured out of renewable raw material and is subjected to Elemental Chlorine Free (ECF) bleaching. As the paper is acid free, it has a longer colour stability and enhanced permanency in terms of strength characteristics.
TNPL caters to the requirements of multifunctional printing processes like sheet-fed, web offset, and digital printers. The paper reels have uniform profile with strength properties to cope even with high speed machines. TNPL manufactures Printing and Writing Papers in substances ranging from 50 GSM to 90 GSM.
Newsprint is normally manufactured in 49 Gsm reels and directly sold by the company to the various newspaper establishments such as The Hindu, Malayala Manorama, Ananda Bazaar Patrika and so on.
Printing & Writing paper (PWP) is manufactured in reel and sheet forms with the Gsm (Grams per square meter – basis weight of the paper) varying from 50 to 80. Various sizes of reels and sheets are also cut to suit the customer requirements. Some of the major end-use segments of PWP are printing applications, note books, computer stationery, office stationery, etc.

 TNPL Ultra White Maplitho
 Radiant Printing
 Hardbound Notebook
 TNPL Offset Printing
 Cream wove
 Copy Crown
 TNPL Copier
 Students' Favorites
 Super Print Maplitho
 Perfect Copier
 Ace Marvel

Export network
TNPL is also exporting about 18% of the PWP production to 20 countries around the World.

 Australia
 Egypt
 Greece
 Indonesia
 Jordan
 Kenya
 Malaysia
 Myanmar
 Nepal
 Nigeria
 Philippines
 Singapore
 Sri Lanka
 Sudan
 South Africa
 Taiwan
 Turkey
 U.A.E
 U.K
 U.S.A.
 Yemen

Symbolic of TNPL's commitment to the environment, the ‘’’World Wide Fund for nature (WWF)’’’ has entered into a pact with TNPL to use the ‘'Panda'’ logo in TNPL's branded products.

Criticism / controversy
On 14 September 2009, General Farmers' Association of Pugalur, the Pugalur Consumer Protection Council and the Pugalur Channel Aycutdars' Association have alleged that the TNPL had released the effluents "on a large scale" into the channel. The "excessive" discharge resorted to by the TNPL on that day has caused consternation among the public in the area who "are afraid of the ill effects of the effluents" that flowed down the channel.

Areas affected:
Punjai Thottakurichi
Punjai Kadambankurichi
Nanniyur Pudur
Thalavapalayam
Ayyampalayam
Vangal areas in Karur district.
On the other side of the TNPL paper mill, areas such as
Moolimangalam
Moorthypalayam
have also been affected due to the pollution caused by the TNPL.
Moreover, the agricultural lands in the Karur District are well affected. The area around the Paper mill seems to have some bad smell.

TNPL's reaction
Reacting to the claims, the TNPL has claimed that no water or effluent was being let into the Pugalur Channel as alleged. TNPL Managing Director Mohammed Nasimuddin informed that "The TNPL has implemented a Mill Development Plan at a capital outlay of 6 billion mainly for incorporating various environmental improvement measures such as switching over to Elemental Chlorine Free Bleaching and reduction in water consumption. In this system the use of chlorine is totally eliminated and the bleaching is carried out only by chlorine dioxide"

TNPL cement business 
TNPL has started its new 600 TPD Cement Plant production in January 2013 at a cost of 1 billion. It will supply under the brand "TNPL Cement Ltd".

TNPL electricity business 
TNPL has captive power plant of 103.63 MW capacity.

TNPL tissue paper business 
TNPL will commence its new 100 TPD Tissue Paper Plant production at a cost of 2 billion.

TNPL De-inking Plant 
TNPL will set up a de-inking plant with a capacity of 300 TPD at an investment of 1.75 billion.

TNPL privatisation and shareholding 
 In the wake of new policies of Government of India such as Liberalization, Globalization and Privatization the Government of Tamil Nadu had started to implement Liberalization, Globalization and Privatization scheme in TNPL.
 As the first step towards Liberalization, Globalization and Privatization Government of Tamil Nadu listed TNPL shares in following organizations
 Bombay Stock Exchange
 National Stock Exchange of India
 National Securities Depository Limited
 Central Depository Services Limited
 Debenture Trustees – Vijaya Bank

 TNPL became a share market listed company from the year 1997.
 Presently Government of Tamil Nadu holds 35.32% (Out of 100%) of Equity shares in TNPL as of 31 March 2012 as per 
 Government of Tamil Nadu declared TNPL as "Other Companies" List from previous "Government of Tamil Nadu's Public Sector Undertakings" List after the year 1997

TNPL Management 
Thiru. Gnanadesikan, IAS – Chairman
 Thiru S. Sivashanmugaraja, IAS – Managing Director
 Thiru. Nagappan – Director
 Thiru. Soundarakumar, I.A.S – Director
 Thiru. Rita Harish Thakkar, I.A.S – Director
 Thiru. N. Narayanan – Director
 Thiru. V. Chandrasekaran – Director
 Thiru. Shanmugam – Director
The Above details as per tnpl.com

References 

Companies based in Chennai
Pulp and paper companies of India
Government agencies established in 1979
Government-owned companies of India
1979 establishments in Tamil Nadu
Indian companies established in 1979
Companies listed on the National Stock Exchange of India
Companies listed on the Bombay Stock Exchange